Eugenio Javier Hernández Flores (born October 17, 1959 in Ciudad Victoria, Tamaulipas), is a Mexican politician affiliated with the Institutional Revolutionary Party (PRI). He was the mayor of Ciudad Victoria from 2001 to 2004 and Governor of the state of Tamaulipas from 2004 to 2010, and was also federal deputy in 2000 and coordinator of the Financial Committee of Tomas Yarrington during his campaign. On May 27, 2015, he was indicted on charges of money laundering alongside his brother-in-law Oscar Gomez Guerra by the United States Department of Justice (USDOJ).

Personal life 
He is fourth child of Eugenio Hernández Balboa and Susana Flores Fernández. He studied civil engineering at the Monterrey Institute of Technology and Higher Education. He is married to Adriana González de Hernández with whom he has four children. In his earliest professional life he worked in the construction industry, where he became President of the Chamber of the Mexican Construction Industry and President of the municipal Commission the Water and Sewer System.

Political career 
He was affiliated with Institutional Revolutionary Party in 1997. In 1999 during the presidential campaign of Francisco Labastida Ochoa, Eugenio Hernández was appointed as state's campaign coordinator in Tamaulipas. The same year, he was elected as general secretary of the Directive Committee of the PRI party.

In year 2000 he was elected federal deputy of the V Electoral District, in this way he became part of LVIII Legislatura where he was member in the Housing Commission and in Water resources one, as such he introduced the bill of reformation of article 46 of the Housing Workers Fund Law.
In that year he requested a permission of license as deputy to become a candidate in Ciudad Victoria's mayor election, which he won. He took the mayor's post in 2001.

Tamaulipas Governor 
In PRI's internal election he was appointed as candidate of that party to participate in the Tamaulipas Governor election to be run on June 26, 2004. Thus, he took part in Governor's election against the opponent candidates: Gustavo Cárdenas of PAN, Álvaro Garza Cantú of the alliance formed by Party of the Democratic Revolution and Convergencia, and Bruno Álvarez of the Labor Party. The elections were run on November 14 and  Eugenio Hernández was elected governor with 58.26% of all votes.

He began his government on February 5, 2005. In May of that year, he introduced his Plan of Development of the State for the period 2005–2010, which was the guide for the public policy throughout his  period of government, his government was based in three strategic lines: I) Social Prosperity; II) Competitivity and Productivity; e III) Strong institutions and Government of results.

His government was relevant for the constant fight against organized crime. He promoted an alliance with the rest of Mexican border states, the municipalities and federal government to avoid the traffic of arms and people between the United States and Mexico. As the results of this agreement, it was allowed to the Mexican army to settle down in Tamaulipas with thousands of troops to manage the fight against drug dealers and look after custom services in Tamaulipas. He expressed his agreement to make a public ballot question to put on people's consideration the possibility to impose the capital punishment as penalty for kidnapping and to stop the violence from crime. At the final stage of his government, Hernández Flores remarked that 42% of police members have been destituted as they were untrustworthy.

With respect to relations with the US states bordering Tamaulipas, Hernández Flores was a principal critic of the immigration laws applied in Texas. He was against the barrier raised between the countries during his term in office.
In economic matters, he promoted the internal oil investments in Tamaulipas and the creation of jobs coming from that industry. Thus, when PetroleosMexicanos company announced that another refinery was going to be built in Mexico, Hernández Flores proposed that it be sited at Tamaulipas. It was ultimately decided that the refinery be built in Hidalgo state.

During his term as governor, Fitch Ratings recognized excellent financial management in Tamaulipas. Nevertheless, after his government he was accused of generating an over-indebtedness.

Indictment

On May 27, 2015, Hernández Flores was indicted on charges of money laundering alongside his brother-in-law Oscar Gomez Guerra by the United States Department of Justice (USDOJ), making him a "fugitive" wanted by the United States. The charges concern a US$30 million sum plus US$2 million invested in three properties in McAllen, Texas and a fourth property in Austin, Texas.

See also
List of fugitives from justice who disappeared

Notes

External links
 Government of Tamaulipas: Eugenio Hernández

|-

1959 births
Living people
Governors of Tamaulipas
Municipal presidents in Tamaulipas
Institutional Revolutionary Party politicians
Monterrey Institute of Technology and Higher Education alumni
People from Ciudad Victoria
21st-century Mexican politicians
Fugitives wanted by the United States
Mexican politicians convicted of crimes